Partenope Napoli Basket is an Italian amateur basketball team from Naples, Campania.

History
Partenope Napoli Basket first took part in the top-tier level Italian first division, the LBA, from 1963 to 1965. After stabilizing itself in the top level Italian league in 1967, it stayed there until 1975, with a second-place finish in the 1968–69 season. The club won the 1968 Italian Cup and the European-wide secondary level 1969–70 season's FIBA European Cup Winners' Cup.

The club played in the Italian second division, the Serie A2, between 1975 and 1978, and again for a solitary season in the 1997–98 season. The club then went bankrupt at the end of that season. The club was then re-founded in 2001.

The club played in the amateur Italian 4th-tier level Serie C Basket, during the 2014–15 season.

Honours
Total titles: 2

Domestic competitions
Italian Cup
 Winners (1): 1967–68
 Runners-up (2): 1968–69, 1970–71

European competitions
FIBA Saporta Cup
 Winners (1): 1969–70
 Semifinalist (2): 1970–71, 1971–72

Notable players 

1960's
  Remo Maggetti
  Renato Abbate
  Paolo Vittori
  Ottorino Flaborea
  Jim Williams
  Lorenzo Angori
  Giovanni Gavagnin
  Carlos D'Aquila
  Sauro Bufalini
  Miles Aiken

1990's
  Yamen Sanders
  Sergio Mastroianni
   Kenny Atkinson
  Dave Johnson

1970 FIBA European Cup Winners' Cup winning squad
Miles Aiken, Jim Williams, Sauro Bufalini, Carlos d'Aquila, Remo Maggetti, Giovanni Gavagnin, Francesco Ovi, Antonio Errico, Vincenzo Errico, Manfredo Fucile, Renato Abbate, Leonardo Coen (Coach: Antonio Zorzi)

Sponsorship names
Throughout the years, due to sponsorship, the club has been known as:
 Ignis Sud Napoli (1967–1968)
 Fides Napoli (1968–1972)
 Fag Napoli (1973–1976)
 Cosatto Napoli (1976–1977)
 Gis Napoli (1977–1978) 
 Pasta Baronia Napoli (1997–1998)

References

External links
Serie A historical results  Retrieved 24 August 2015
Eurobasket.com profile

1957 establishments in Italy
Basketball teams established in 1957
Basketball teams in Campania
Sport in Naples